Leiostracus demerarensis is a species of tropical air-breathing land snail, a terrestrial pulmonate gastropod mollusc in the family Simpulopsidae.

Distribution
This species is endemic to South America and is so far known to occur in Guyana, Suriname, French Guiana, and northern Brazil.

References

External links
 L. (1861). Descriptions of forty-seven new species of land-shells, from the collection of H. Cuming, Esq. Proceedings of the Zoological Society of London. 29(2): 20–29, pls 2–3. London

Simpulopsidae
Gastropods described in 1861